The Marlins Puerto Cruz, also referred to as the Tenerife Marlins, are a baseball team based in Santa Cruz de Tenerife, Spain. They are members of the top division of Spanish Baseball, the Division de Honor de Beisbol.

History
The Marlins Puerto Cruz were founded in 1997 and have enjoyed considerable success in the Spanish and European baseball circuits. The team won the Copa del Rey every year from 2005–2009 and the CEB Cup in 2004. The Junior Team won the 2010 Junior Championship Series.

Trophies
División de Honor: 11
2005, 2006, 2007, 2008, 2009, 2013, 2014, 2015, 2017, 2018, 2019
Copa del Rey: 6
2007, 2009, 2010, 2011, 2012, 2013
CEB Cup: 1
2004

Uniforms
The team's uniforms and moniker on modeled on those of the Miami Marlins.  The team's colors are sky blue and black.

References

External links
Official website

Baseball teams in Spain
Sport in Tenerife
Baseball teams established in 1997
1997 establishments in Spain
Sports teams in the Canary Islands